The 43rd running of the Tour of Flanders cycling classic was held on Sunday, 30 March 1959. Belgian Rik Van Looy won the race in a three-man sprint with Frans Schoubben and Gilbert Desmet. 58 of 143 riders finished.

Route
The race started in Ghent and finished in Wetteren – covering 242 km. The course featured five categorized climbs:
 Kwaremont
 Kruisberg
 Statieberg
 Valkenberg
 Kloosterstraat (Geraardsbergen)

Results

References

Tour of Flanders
Tour of Flanders
Tour of Flanders
Tour of Flanders